Madhya Pradesh Medical Science University (MPMSU), also known as Madhya Pradesh Ayurvigyan Vishwavidyalaya, is a state university located at Jabalpur, Madhya Pradesh, India. It was established in 2011 by the Government of Madhya Pradesh and has jurisdiction over all medical, dental, nursing, paramedical, Ayurveda, homeopathic, Unani, and Yoga colleges in Madhya Pradesh. It has about 300 affiliated colleges and a yearly intake of 80,000 students.

References

External links

 
Medical and health sciences universities in India
Universities in Madhya Pradesh
Educational institutions established in 2011
2011 establishments in Madhya Pradesh
Medical colleges in Madhya Pradesh
Education in Jabalpur
Public medical universities